The Other Side of November is a 2016 Quebec feature film produced, written and directed by Maryanne Zéhil. The cast includes Arsinée Khanjian, Pascale Bussières, Marc Labrèche, Raïa Haïdar, Béatrice Moukhaiber and an array of Lebanese actors and actresses. The film is a drama dealing with disappearing memory, choices that transform one’s destiny, and how societies shape people by offering them lives that are diametrically opposed to ones they could have lived elsewhere.

Plot 
In The Other Side of November, a woman is granted two lives: Léa (played by Arsinée Khanjian), is a bourgeois neurosurgeon living in Quebec, and Layla (also played by Arsinée Khanjian), is a humble seamstress in a small village in Lebanon. These two paths illuminate two different societies and their influence on self-realization. Time and fragmented memories are used playfully to tell the story.  The question at the heart of the film is: If someone chose a different path in life years ago, would they still be the same person today?

Cast

Inspiration 
Having left Lebanon in 1995 to settle in Quebec, Zehil draws from her own experience to tell this story. She quickly realized that "once you leave your country, settle in another, and integrate completely in order to rebuild your life, there is no way back." She constructs the story from this inevitability by relying on some of her most cherished themes: one’s country of birth, the country that becomes a new home, being human, the place of women in society, and the struggle between what is acquired and what is innate. Zehil uses the loss of memory—whether caused by illness or a deliberate choice—as a foundation, in an attempt to separate free will from that which is predestined, a choice or destiny she says she can no longer escape.

Festivals 

 Festival du Nouveau Cinéma
 Sherbrooke World Film Festival
 Outaouais Film Festival

References

External links 
 

2016 films
2016 drama films
Canadian drama films
Quebec films
Films set in Quebec
French-language Canadian films
2010s Canadian films